Wolseley was a provincial electoral district  for the Legislative Assembly of the province of Saskatchewan, Canada. Centred on the town of Wolseley, it was one of 25 constituencies created for the 1st Saskatchewan general election in 1905.

Created as "Wolseley" before 1905, the district was redrawn and renamed "Moose Mountain" in 1908. Redrawn and renamed again in 1921, the riding was abolished before the 8th Saskatchewan general election in 1934 into Qu'Appelle-Wolseley and Moosomin.

It is now part of the constituencies of Indian Head-Milestone and Moosomin.

Members of the Legislative Assembly

Election results

Wolseley (1905 – 1908)

|-
 
| style="width: 130px" |Provincial Rights
|William Elliott
|align="right"|715
|align="right"|50.71%
|align="right"|–

|- bgcolor="white"
!align="left" colspan=3|Total
!align="right"|1,410
!align="right"|100.00%
!align="right"|

Moose Mountain (1908 – 1921)

|-
 
| style="width: 130px" |Provincial Rights
|William Elliott
|align="right"|1,023
|align="right"|51.23%
|align="right"|-0.52

|- bgcolor="white"
!align="left" colspan=3|Total
!align="right"|1,997
!align="right"|100.00%
!align="right"|

|-

 
|Conservative
|William Elliott
|align="right"|896
|align="right"|47.23%
|align="right"|-4.00
|- bgcolor="white"
!align="left" colspan=3|Total
!align="right"|1,897
!align="right"|100.00%
!align="right"|

|-

 
|Conservative
|William Elliott
|align="right"|1,697
|align="right"|48.20%
|align="right"|+0.97
|- bgcolor="white"
!align="left" colspan=3|Total
!align="right"|3,521
!align="right"|100.00%
!align="right"|

Wolseley (1921 – 1934)

|-
} 
| style="width: 130px" |Independent
|William George Bennett
|align="right"|2,322
|align="right"|54.51%
|align="right"|–

|- bgcolor="white"
!align="left" colspan=3|Total
!align="right"|4,260
!align="right"|100.00%
!align="right"|

|-

 
|Conservative
|William George Bennett
|align="right"|2,377
|align="right"|48.16%
|align="right"|-6.35
|- bgcolor="white"
!align="left" colspan=3|Total
!align="right"|4,936
!align="right"|100.00%
!align="right"|

|-
 
| style="width: 130px" |Conservative
|William George Bennett
|align="right"|3,450
|align="right"|57.73%
|align="right"|+9.57

|- bgcolor="white"
!align="left" colspan=3|Total
!align="right"|5,976
!align="right"|100.00%
!align="right"|

See also
Wolseley – Northwest Territories territorial electoral district (1870–1905).

Electoral district (Canada)
List of Saskatchewan provincial electoral districts
List of Saskatchewan general elections
List of political parties in Saskatchewan
Wolseley, Saskatchewan

References
 Saskatchewan Archives Board – Saskatchewan Election Results By Electoral Division

Former provincial electoral districts of Saskatchewan